Wendy Weinberg (now Wendy Weinberg Weil; born June 27, 1958) is an American former competition swimmer who was an Olympic Games, Pan American Games, and Maccabiah Games medalist.

Biography
At the 1973 Maccabiah Games in Israel, she won a gold medal in the 800-meter freestyle, as well as in the women's 200 m butterfly and the women's 400 m medley. She won a total of four gold medals in the 1973 Maccabiah Games.

In 1975, she established an American record in the 200-meter butterfly, swimming it in 2:18.2 at the West German Bremen Swimfest. That year she also won a gold medal and set a new Pan American Games record in Mexico City in the 800-meter freestyle, winning it in 9:05.47.

She attended and swam for the University of Virginia on a swimming scholarship, where she was an All American. She transferred to the University of North Carolina, and earned an MS at UNC Chapel Hill, as well as received  a Graduate Certificate in Physical Therapy from Emory University.

Weinberg represented the United States at the 1976 Summer Olympics in Montreal, Quebec.  She won a bronze medal in the women's 800-meter freestyle for placing third (8:42.60), following East German Petra Thumer (8:37.14), and American teammate Shirley Babashoff (8:37.59).

At the 1977 Maccabiah Games (the "Jewish Olympics") in Israel, Weinberg – who is Jewish – won six gold medals and two silver medals. Among her golds was a win in the 200 m freestyle (in 2:08.96), the 200 m butterfly, the 400 m freestyle, the 800 m freestyle,and a win in the 4×100-meter medley relay team which she was captain of (in 4:10.09).</ref> Her silver medals were in the 100 m freestyle and the 100 m butterfly.

See also

 List of Olympic medalists in swimming (women)
 List of select Jewish swimmers
 List of University of North Carolina at Chapel Hill alumni
 List of University of North Carolina at Chapel Hill Olympians
 List of University of Virginia people

References

External links
 

1958 births
Living people
American female butterfly swimmers
American female freestyle swimmers
Jewish American sportspeople
Jewish swimmers
Maccabiah Games gold medalists for the United States
Maccabiah Games silver medalists for the United States
Competitors at the 1973 Maccabiah Games
Competitors at the 1977 Maccabiah Games
North Carolina Tar Heels women's swimmers
Olympic bronze medalists for the United States in swimming
Sportspeople from Baltimore
Emory University alumni
Swimmers at the 1975 Pan American Games
Swimmers at the 1976 Summer Olympics
Virginia Cavaliers women's swimmers
Medalists at the 1976 Summer Olympics
Pan American Games gold medalists for the United States
Pan American Games medalists in swimming
Universiade medalists in swimming
Maccabiah Games medalists in swimming
Universiade bronze medalists for the United States
Medalists at the 1977 Summer Universiade
Medalists at the 1975 Pan American Games
21st-century American Jews
21st-century American women